Maurice Henry Hewlett (1861 – 15 June 1923) was an English historical novelist, poet and essayist.

Biography
He was born at Weybridge, the eldest son of Henry Gay Hewlett, of Shaw Hall, Addington, Kent. He was educated at the London International College, Spring Grove, Isleworth, and was called to the bar in 1891. He gave up the law after the success of The Forest Lovers. From 1896 to 1901 he was Keeper of Lands,  Revenues, Records and Enrolments, a government post as adviser on matters of medieval law.

Hewlett married Hilda Beatrice Herbert on 3 January 1888 in St Peter's Church, Vauxhall, where her father was the incumbent vicar. The couple had two children, a daughter, Pia, and a son, Francis, but separated in 1914, partly due to Hilda's increasing interest in aviation. In 1911, Hilda had become the first woman in the UK to gain a pilot's licence.

He settled at Broad Chalke, Wiltshire. His friends included Evelyn Underhill, and Ezra Pound, whom he met at the Poets' Club in London. He was also a friend of J. M. Barrie, who named one of the pirates in Peter Pan "Cecco" after Hewlett's son.

Hewlett's 1900 novel The Life and Death of Richard Yea-and-Nay, about Richard the Lionheart, was a favourite novel of T. E. Lawrence. Lawrence said he had read The Life and Death of Richard Yea-and-Nay several times. Another of Hewlett's historical novels was The Queen's Quair (1904), about Mary, Queen of Scots. The Queen's Quair was cited as an influence by Ford Madox Ford, who said that The Queen's Quair "taught me a good deal". Hewlett also wrote six novels based on the Icelandic Family sagas, these include The Light Heart and Thorgils of Treadholt. Hewlett also wrote The Outlaw (based on Gisli's Saga), A Lover's Tale (based on Kormak's Saga), Frey and His Wife (based on Ogmund Dytt's tale), and Gudred the Fair (based on the Greenland sagas).

Hewlett was parodied by Max Beerbohm in A Christmas Garland in the part titled "Fond Hearts Askew".

Maurice Hewlett died in London on 15 June 1923 at age 62.

Works

Earthwork Out of Tuscany (1895) travel
The Masque of Dead Florentines (1895) verse
Songs and Meditations (1897)
The Forest Lovers (1898) historical novel
Pan and the Young Shepherd (1898) play
Youngest of the Angels (1898) play
Little Novels of Italy (1899) short stories
The Life and Death of Richard Yea-and-Nay (1900) (AKA Richard Yea-and-Nay) historical novel
The New Canterbury Tales (1901)
The Queen's Quair or The Six Years' Tragedy (1904) historical novel about Mary, Queen of Scots
The Road in Tuscany. A Commentary (1904) travel; illustrations by Joseph Pennell
Fond Adventures: Tales of the Youth of the World (1905) short stories
Buondelomente's Saga (1905) historical novel
The Fool Errant (1905) historical novel
The Heart's Key (1905) historical novel
The Love Chase (1905) historical novel
The Stooping Lady (1907) historical novel
The Spanish Jade (1908) historical novel set in Spain in 1860.
Artemision (1909) poems
Halfway House (1908) novel
Open Country (1909) novel
Rest Harrow (1910) novel
Letters to Sanchia (1910)
The Agonists, a Trilogy of God and Man (1911)
The Song of Renny (1911)
Brazenhead the Great (1911)
The Countess of Picpus (1911) historical novel
Mrs. Lancelot: A Comedy of Assumptions (1912) historical novel
The Lore of Proserpine (1913) autobiographical account
Bendish (1913) historical novel
For Two Voices (1914) Poem
The Little Iliad (1915)
A Lover's Tale (1915) historical novel
The Song of the Plow (1916)
Frey and his Wife (1916)
Gudrid the Fair (1918) historical novel
Thorgils of Treadholt (1917) historical novel
The Village Wife’s Lament (1918) poems
In Green Shade (1920)
Mainwaring (1920) historical novel
The Light Heart (1920) historical novel
Outlaw (1920) historical novel
Wiltshire Essays (1921)
Extemporary Essays (1922)
The Last Essays of Maurice Hewlett (1924)
The Letters of Maurice Hewlett (1926)  edited by Laurence Binyon

Filmography
The Spanish Jade (1915)
The Spanish Jade (1922)
Open Country (1922)

Notes

References
Maurice Hewlett: A Sketch of His Career and Some Reviews of His Books, by James Lane Allen
A bibliography of the first editions of books by Maurice Henry Hewlett (1861–1923) (1973) Percival Horace Muir

This list omits some significant works. He wrote six novels based on the Icelandic Family sagas, of which only The Light Heart and Thorgils of Treadholt are mentioned above. There is also The Outlaw (based on Gisli's Saga), A Lover's Tale (based on Kormak's Saga), Frey and His Wife (based on Ogmund Dytt's tale), and Gudred the Fair (based on the Greenland sagas).

External links

 Maurice Hewlett Collection at the Harry Ransom Center
 Maurice Hewlett Collection at the Beinecke Rare Book and Manuscript Library
 
 
 
 
 Works by Maurice Hewlett at Hathi Trust
 
 

1861 births
1923 deaths
English male poets
19th-century English novelists
20th-century English novelists
English historical novelists
English essayists
British male essayists
English male novelists
19th-century English male writers
19th-century essayists
20th-century essayists
20th-century English male writers
English male non-fiction writers
Writers of historical fiction set in the Middle Ages
Writers of historical fiction set in the early modern period
Writers of historical fiction set in the modern age